Selsted is a hamlet in Kent, England. It is in the local government district of Folkestone and Hythe, and the electoral ward of North Downs East.

During 2006, protests were held against a proposed closure of Selsted Church of England Promary School by Kent County Council, however, the plan was abandoned in September 2006.

The village has a cricket team in Division 2 of the Kent Village League, and who were the 2007 Lords Ashford League Champions.

References

Hamlets in Kent